Comptosia neobiguttata is a species of bee flies in the family Bombyliidae, first described by David Keith Yeates in 1991.

It is found in the Australian Capital Territory, New South Wales, and Queensland.

References

Bombyliidae
Insects described in 1991
Insects of Australia